The West Chōsen Central Railway (Japanese: 西鮮中央鉄道, Sōsen Chūō Tetsudō; Korean: 서선중앙철도, Seoseon Jung'ang Cheoldo), was a privately owned railway company in Japanese-occupied Korea.

History
The West Chōsen Central Railway opened its lines from Seunghori to Jangsang in several staged between 1939 and 1945. The first section,  from Seunghori to Seongneum, was opened on 29 June 1939, followed five months later by an  extension to Pyeongnam Gangdong.

On 1 October 1941 a second line was opened, isolated from the first, made up of a  mainline running from Sinseongcheon to Bukchang with a  branchline, the Jaedong Line, from Gujeong to Jaedong. The newly built line did not long remain part of the West Chōsen railway, as on 1 April 1944 the line from Seunghori as far as Sinseongcheon was nationalised by the Chosen Government Railway (Sentetsu) and incorporated into the Pyeongyang Colliery Line.

The West Chōsen Central Railway nevertheless continued expanding its truncated mainline, called the Seoseon Line, receiving approval from the Railway Bureau on 21 June 1940 to extend its line to Deokcheon and thence onwards to the Jangsang coal fields, in order to transport coal from the mines in the area opened in 1938 by the Chosen Anthracite Company. The first of these extensions was a  stretch from Bukchang to Okcheon opened on 28 December 1944, which was followed by a second extension,  to Jangan, opened on 25 May 1945, reaching Deokcheon a few months later.

The West Chōsen Central Railway planned its Deokbal Line (덕발선, 徳八線) line to run from Deokcheon to Gujang via Jangsangri, to connect there with Sentetsu's Manpo Line. However, the terrain proved too difficult, and, after adding a signal station at Hyangjang between Hyangwon and Jangsangni, construction on the current alignment of the line to Gujang began. However, this wasn't completed before war's end; it was only after the end of the Korean War that the connection to Gujang and the Manpo Line was finally made.

After the end of the Pacific War and subsequent partition of Korea, the line was within the territory of the DPRK, and was nationalised by the Provisional People’s Committee for North Korea along with all other railways in the Soviet zone of occupation on 10 August 1946, becoming part of the Korean State Railway. The line is now part of the P'yŏngdŏk Line, with the Hyangjang–Jangsang section now forming the Changsang Line.

Operations
In addition to trains on its own lines, the West Chōsen Central Railway also operated a train in conjunction with the Chōsen Pyeongan Railway, from Deokcheon to Yonggang Oncheon, terminus of the latter's Oncheon Line.

Rolling Stock

As traffic volumes increased significantly through the Pacific War, the West Chōsen Central Railway found itself needing more power. As a result, eight Mikasa (ミカサ) class 2-8-2 steam locomotives were bought in 1943 and 1944.

More were needed, but as the capacity of locomotive builders in Japan and Korea was already being stretched, Mikaro (ミカロ) class locomotives were borrowed from the South Manchuria Railway (Mantetsu) to alleviate the power shortage. Of these, the identities of two are known for certain - ミカロ18 and ミカロ22.

Network

References

Rail transport in North Korea
Rail transport in Korea
Defunct railway companies of Korea
Korea under Japanese rule
Defunct companies of Japan